Eskan is a village in Badakhshan Province in north-eastern Afghanistan. It is located in the valley of the Munjan, about 18 miles upstream of Jurm. Around the turn of the 20th century it had been a village of roughly 40 houses.

References

Populated places in Jurm District